Kiev Governorate was an administrative division of the Russian Empire from 1796 to 1919 and the Ukrainian Soviet Socialist Republic from 1919 to 1925. It was formed as a governorate in the right-bank Ukraine region after a division of the Kiev Viceroyalty into the Kiev and the Little Russia Governorates in 1796, with its administrative centre in Kiev. By the early 20th century, it consisted of 12 uyezds, 12 cities, 111 miasteczkos and 7344 other settlements. After the October Revolution, it became part of the administrative division of the Ukrainian SSR. In 1923 it was divided into several okrugs and on 6 June 1925 it was abolished by the Soviet administrative reforms.

History
The Kiev Governorate on the right bank of Dnieper was officially established by Emperor Paul I's edict of November 30, 1796. However it was not until 1800 when there was appointed the first governor and the territory was governed by the Kiev Viceroy Vasiliy Krasno-Milashevich (in 1796 –1800).

Three existing Left-bank Ukraine viceroyalties were merged into one Little Russia Governorate centered on Chernigov, while the Kiev Governorate was now comprised on Right-bank Ukraine. With Kiev still a capital, the governorate included the right-bank parts of the former Kiev Viceroyalty merged with territories of the former Kiev and Bracław Voivodeships which were gained by the Russian Empire from the partitions of the Polish–Lithuanian Commonwealth (the lands of the Polish Crown province). The edict took effect on August 29, 1797, bringing the total number of uyezds to twelve.

On January 22, 1832, the Kiev Governorate, along with the Volhynia and the Podolia Governorates formed the Kiev Governorate General, also known as the Southwestern Krai. At the time, Vasily Levashov was appointed the Military Governor of Kiev as well as the General Governor of Podolia and Volhynia. In 1845, the population of the Governorate was 1,704,661.

At the turn of the 20th century, the governorate included twelve uyezds named by their centers: Berdychiv, Cherkasy, Chyhyryn, Kaniv, Kiev, Lipovets, Radomyshl, Skvyra, Tarashcha, Uman, Vasylkiv and Zvenyhorodka.

By the 1897 Russian Census, there were 3,559,229 people in the guberniya making it the most populous one in the whole Russian Empire. Most of population was rural. There were 459,253 people living in cities, including about 248,000 in Kiev. According to the mother tongue, the census classified the respondents as follows: 2,819,145 Malorossy (Ukrainians) representing 79.2% of the population, 430,489 Jews representing 12.1% of the population, 209,427 Velikorossy (Russians) representing 5.9% of the population, and 68,791 Poles representing 1.9% of the population. By faith, 2,983,736 census respondents were Orthodox Christians, 433,728 were Jews and 106,733 were of the Roman Catholic Church.

The estimated population in 1906 was 4,206,100.

Kiev Governorate remained a constituent unit of the larger Governorate General with Kiev being the capital of both well into the 20th century. In 1915, the General Governorate was disbanded while the guberniya continued to exist.

Administrative division
Kiev Governorate consisted of 12 uyezds (their administrative centres in brackets):

Principal cities

Russian Empire Census of 1897

 Kiev – 247,723 (Russian  – 134 278, Ukrainian – 55 064, Jewish – 29 937, Polish  – 16 579, German  – 4 354, Belorusian  – 2 797)
 Berdichev – 53,351 (Jewish – 41 125, Russian – 4 612, Ukrainian – 4 395)
 Uman – 31,016 (Jewish – 17 709, Ukrainian – 9 509, Russian – 2 704)
 Cherkassy – 29,600 (Ukrainian – 12 900, Jewish – 10 916, Russian – 4 911)
 Skvira – 17,958 (Jewish – 8 905, Ukrainian – 7 681, Russian – 956)
 Zvenigorodka – 16,923 (Ukrainian – 8 337, Jewish – 6 368, Russian – 1 513)
 Vasilkov – 13,132 (Ukrainian – 7 108, Jewish – 5 140, Russian – 820)
 Tarascha – 11,259 (Ukrainian – 5 601, Jewish – 4 906, Russian – 575)
 Radomysl – 10,906 (Jewish – 7 468, Ukrainian – 2 463, Russian – 778)
Smaller cities
 Chigirin – 9,872 (Ukrainian – 6 578, Jewish – 2 921, Russian – 343)
 Kanev – 8,855 (Ukrainian – 5 770, Jewish – 2 710, Russian – 303)
 Lipovets – 8,658 (Jewish – 4 117, Ukrainian – 3 948, Russian – 397)

After 1917

In the times after the Russian revolution in 1917–1921, the lands of Kiev Governorate switched hands many times. After the last Imperial governor, Alexey Ignatyev until March 6, 1917, the local leaders were appointed by competing authorities. At times, the Governorate Starosta (appointed by the Central Rada) and the Governorate Commissar (sometimes underground) both claimed the Governorate, while some of the short-lived ruling regimes of the territory did not establish any particular administrative subdivision.

As chaos gave way to stability in the early 1920s, the Soviet Ukrainian authority re-established the Governorate whose leading post was titled the Chairman of the Governorate's Revolutionary Committee (revkom) or of the Executive Committee (ispolkom).

In the course of the Soviet administrative reform of 1923–1929 the Kiev Governorate of Ukrainian SSR was transformed into six okruhas in 1923, and, since 1932, Kiev Oblast at the territory.

List of okruhas
 Berdychiv Okruha
 Bila Tserkva Okruha
 Kiev Okruha
 Malyn Okruha (1923–24)
 Uman Okruha
 Cherkasy Okruha
 Shevchenko Okruha (1923–25, initially as Korsun)

Governors of Kiev

Russian Empire
 1839–1852 Ivan Funduklei
 1852–1855 Andrei Krivtsov (acting)
 1855–1864 Pavel Gesse
 1864–1866 Nikolai Kaznakov
 1866–1868 Nikolai Eiler
 1868–1871 Mikhail Katakazi
 1881–1885 Sergei Gudim-Levkovich
 1885–1898 Lev Tomara
 1898–1903 Fyodor Trepov
 1903–1905 Pavel Savvich
 1905–1905 Aleksandr Vatatsi
 1905–1906 Pavel Savvich
 1906–1906 Aleksei Veretennikov
 1906–1907 Pavel Kurlov (acting)
 1907–1909 Pavel Ignatiev
 1909–1912 Aleksei Girs
 1912–1915 Nikolai Sukovkin
 1915–1917 Aleksei Ignatiev

Russian Republic
as Governing Commissioners
 1917–1917 Mikhail Sukovkin
 1917–1918 Oleksandr Salikovsky

Ukrainian State
as Governing Elders
 1918–1918 I.Chartoryzhski

South Russia
 191 –1919 Andrei Cherniavsky

Soviet governors

1919–1919 Yakov Yakovlev
1919–1920 Abram Glinski
1920–1920 Ivan Klimenko
1920–1920 Panas Lyubchenko
1920–1920 Yan Gamarnik
1920–1921 Aleksandr Odintsov
1921–1921 Nikolai Golubenko
1921–1923 Lavrenty Kartvelishvili
1923–1923 Vladimir Loginov
1923–1924 Juozas Vareikis
1924–1924 Lavrenty Kartvelishvili
1924–1925 Pavel Postyshev

Maps

See also
Southwestern Krai

Footnotes and references

Notes

References

Further reading

External links

 
 Shcherbina, V. Kiev voivodes, governors, and general governors from 1654 to 1775 (Кіевскіе воеводы, губернаторы и генералъ-губернаторы отъ 1654 по 1775 г.) . "Chtenia v istoricheskom obshchestve Nestora Letopistsa". Kiev 1892.

 
Governorates of Ukraine
Governorates of the Russian Empire
States and territories established in 1708
States and territories disestablished in 1925
1925 disestablishments in Ukraine
1796 establishments in the Russian Empire